The Grey Corries are a range of mountains in the West Highlands of Scotland. The range includes several of Scotland's highest peaks including a number of Munros. The range is bounded to the north by the great extent of Leanachan Forest beyond which is Glen Spean and the Great Glen, to the east by the defile of Lairig Leacach and to the south by upper Glen Nevis and the headwaters of the Abhainn Rath. The ridge continues westwards at a high level to join Aonach Beag, Aonach Mor, Carn Mor Dearg and Ben Nevis.

From west to east the principal peaks of the range are Sgurr Choinnich Beag, Sgurr Choinnich Mor, Stob Coire Easain, Stob Coire an Laoigh, Caisteal, Stob Coire Cath na Sine, Stob a' Choire Leith, Stob Choire Claurigh (the highest peak of the range at ) and Stob Coire na Ceannan. Stob Coire Gaibhre lies to the north of the eastern end of the range whilst Stob Ban lies to the south of the ridge's eastern end. A northern spur of Stob Coire Easain culminates in Beinn na Socaich (m).

References

External links
 images of the Grey Corries on the Geograph website

Mountains and hills of the Central Highlands
Lochaber
Mountains and hills of Highland (council area)
Geography of Highland (council area)
Mountain ranges of Scotland
One-thousanders of Scotland